Carry On Sergeant is a 1958 British comedy film about National Service starring William Hartnell, Bob Monkhouse and Eric Barker; it is the first in the series of Carry On films, with 31 entries released from 1958 to 1992. The film was based on a play The Bull Boys by R. F. Delderfield and was adapted into a script by Norman Hudis with John Antrobus contributing additional material and replacing the conscripted ballet dancers of the novel into a married couple. It was directed by Gerald Thomas and produced by Peter Rogers, a partnership which would last until 1978. Actors in this film, who went on to be part of the regular team in the series, were Kenneth Williams, Charles Hawtrey, Hattie Jacques, Kenneth Connor and Terry Scott.

Release
This successful first film was screened to the trade and cinema-bookers on 1 August 1958 after which some regional screenings were held from 31 August including Aberdeen and Birmingham.
It was not until 19 September 1958 that it received its London cinema release at the Plaza, and then the film rolled out nationwide on general release from 20 September onwards.

Carry On series

Carry On Sergeant had not been conceived as the start of a film series; only after the film's surprising success did the producer Peter Rogers and the director Gerald Thomas set about planning a further project. After reusing the Carry On prefix and some cast members in their next project Carry On Nurse (1959) and having success with that film, the Carry On series of films evolved. The term "Carry on" is typically issued by an officer to an NCO when handing over control of a parade or inspection.

Plot
Newly married Mary Sage (Shirley Eaton) is distraught when her husband Charlie (Bob Monkhouse) receives his call-up papers during their wedding breakfast. He travels to Heathercrest National Service Depot, meeting fellow recruit Horace Strong (Kenneth Connor), a chronic hypochondriac who is devastated at having been passed as fit.

The new recruits are assigned to Sergeant Grimshaw (William Hartnell). Grimshaw will soon be retiring from the army and takes on a £50 bet with Sergeant O'Brien (Terry Scott) that his last bunch of squaddies will be his first champion platoon.

With beady-eyed inspection from Captain Potts (Eric Barker) and disgruntled support from Corporal Copping (Bill Owen), Grimshaw decides to use some psychology and treat his charges kindly rather than simply shouting at them. But basic training does not start well and he struggles to take his platoon through it. They include failure Herbert Brown (Norman Rossington), upper-class cad Miles Heywood (Terence Longdon), rock 'n' roller Andy Galloway (Gerald Campion), delicate flower Peter Golightly (Charles Hawtrey) and supercilious university graduate James Bailey (Kenneth Williams). His attempts seem doomed.

Mary is determined to spend her wedding night with her husband and smuggles herself into the depot to get a job in the NAAFI, a situation Charlie is eventually able to legitimise. Strong spends most of his time complaining to the Medical Officer, Captain Clark (Hattie Jacques). It is only the adoration of doe-eyed NAAFI girl Norah (Dora Bryan), which he initially rejects, that makes him realise his potential and inspires him to become a real soldier.

On the eve of the final tests, Grimshaw is in despair, but he is overheard bemoaning his lot to Copping. The squad decide to win the best platoon prize at all costs. On the day, they indeed beat the other platoons at all tasks and Grimshaw is awarded the cup for best platoon. On Grimshaw's last day, the men present him with a cigarette lighter as a thank you/retirement present.

Cast

Production
In 1955, film producer Sydney Box approached author R. F. Delderfield to write a screenplay about National Service in the United Kingdom. The project was shelved until 1957 with Delderfield planning to write the screenplay of an ensemble cast film with the working title of The Bull Boys. Delderfield's planned screenplay was to have been "one third laughter, one third documentary one third exciting incident leading up to the climax" with the virtues of National Service shown as giving the young men "pride in their regiment and uniform", similar to Carol Reed's 1944 film The Way Ahead.

Events overtook the film producers when the War Office White Paper of 1957 recommended the end of National Service. Box approached his brother-in-law Peter Rogers then the head of Beaconsfield Film Studios with the pair agreeing that the route to take was making fun of National Service, particularly due to the success of the 1956 Boulting brothers film Private's Progress and the 1957-1962 television series The Army Game. Unlike their disapproval of Private's Progress, the War Office provided assistance to the film makers by providing a Company Sergeant Major to the film. Sequences were shot at Stoughton Barracks the then-home of the Queen's Royal Regiment (West Surrey).

Stuart Levy the co-producer of Anglo-Amalgamated wasn't keen on the title of The Bull Boys. Inspired by the success of another studio's 1957 film Carry On Admiral, suggested the new title of the film. Delderfield's script that involved a male ballet troupe being conscripted was turned into a play.

Soundtrack
Composer Bruce Montgomery wrote the entire score to be played by a military band. The score was played by the Band of the Coldstream Guards.

Title
"Carry on, Sergeant" is a normal expression for an Army officer to use; the American equivalent is, "As you were." (in British English 'As you were' is a military command to withdraw an order i.e. to return to the previous position). The title that replaced The Bull Boys was suggested by Stuart Levy to cash in on the popularity of the 1957 film Carry on Admiral, which was written by Val Guest. At the time, the success of Carry On Sergeant prompted applause and audience laughter in serious settings where the phrase was used, including amongst audiences of the film The Devil's Disciple (1959).

Box office
Budget – £73,000 (estimated)
Gross – £500,000 (UK)
Modern Budget Equivalent: £1.5M
Modern Gross Equivalent: £10.7M

The film was the third most successful movie at the British box office in 1958.

Kinematograph Weekly listed it as being "in the money" at the British box office in 1958.

Filming and locations
Filming dates – 24 March 1958 – 2 May 1958

Interiors:
 Stage B, Pinewood Studios, Buckinghamshire

Exteriors:
 Army camp: Cardwell's Keep, Stoughton Barracks, Stoughton Road, Stoughton near Guildford, Surrey
 Wedding scene: St Mary's Church of England, Church Hill, Harefield, Middlesex
 Church scenes: Beaconsfield, Buckinghamshire

Critical reception
Variety summarised Carry On Sergeant as a "Corny but mostly very funny Army farce that will click in U.K. provinces, and is not designed for any other type of audience" adding, "A bunch of talented character comedians have been handed these situations and, in their respective styles, they wring a lot more out of them and the dialog than the writers provide." The Monthly Film Bulletin called it "a traditionally English mixture of old farcical situations, well-worn jokes, and comic postcard characters. Charles Hawtrey, as a weedy incompetent, and Kenneth Williams, as a condescending intellectual, provide some genuine laughs. The rest of the humour is either overdone or half-baked".

Bibliography

Keeping the British End Up: Four Decades of Saucy Cinema by Simon Sheridan (third edition) (2007) (Reynolds & Hearn Books)

Notes

External links
 
Carry On Sergeant at The Whippit Inn
Carry on Sergeant at BFI Screenonline

1958 films
1958 comedy films
Sergeant
British comedy films
1950s English-language films
Films directed by Gerald Thomas
British black-and-white films
British films based on plays
Films shot at Pinewood Studios
Military humor in film
Films produced by Peter Rogers
Films with screenplays by Norman Hudis
1950s British films